Valley of the Wolves: Homeland is a film of the Turkish TV serial media franchise Valley of the Wolves. The story is about the Turkish coup d'état attempt.

Synopsis 
During an operation in Iraq Polat Alemdar and his team received map of Turkey. The map of Turkey is marked with several key points and strategic places like military bases and special operations centers, but also border town of Yalavuz, near Syria. Enemies who have been waiting for a long time to occupy the land of Turks stand with a large army at the border and wait for the coup's message. Polat Alemdar and his team will fight with the Turkish nation against the enemies in and outside the country.

Cast 
Necati Sasmaz as Polat Alemdar
Erhan Ufak as Erhan
Ertugrul Sakar	as Yasin
Cahit Kayaoglu as Cahit
Nezih Isitan as Dave
Sinem Öztürk as Tegmen Deniz Öztürk
Tuncay Beyazit as Muhtar
Zumre Erturk as Teacher
Iskender Altin as Soros
Yücel Erten as Muhterem
Senol Ipek as Ömer
Özcan Özdemir as Soldier
Esra Isgüzar as Seher Nurse

Sources

External links 
 
 Beyazperde page

Action films based on actual events
Political action films
Turkish action films
Valley of the Wolves
2016 Turkish coup d'état attempt
2017 action drama films
2017 films
2017 television films